Al Rajhi Tower (Arabic: برج الراجحي) is a $500 million USD tower currently proposed for Riyadh, Saudi Arabia. Designs for the sail-shaped tower have been drawn up by architects at Atkins. The tower is being built on behalf of the Al Rajhi family and will be used for commercial purposes. The family, considered by most in Saudi Arabia, as the country's wealthiest non-royals, is among the world's leading philanthropists.

Plans have also been approved for the construction of a new tower to accommodate the Al Rajhi Bank's headquarters in Riyadh, designs for which have been drawn by Skidmore, Owings and Merrill, the architects behind Burj Khalifa. Saudi Arabia's current tallest building is the 601 m Abraj Al Bait Hotel Tower in Makkah. The top of the tower is similar to that of the Burj Al Arab in Dubai with a similar style of helipad and observation area.

References

Skidmore, Owings & Merrill buildings
Proposed skyscrapers
Skyscrapers in Saudi Arabia
Skyscrapers in Riyadh
Proposed buildings and structures in Saudi Arabia